The 1967 Furman Paladins football team was an American football team that represented Furman University as a member of the Southern Conference (SoCon) during the 1967 NCAA University Division football season. In their tenth season under head coach Bob King, Furman compiled a 5–5 record, with a mark of 2–3 in conference play, placing sixth in the SoCon.

Schedule

References

Furman
Furman Paladins football seasons
Furman Paladins football